The Cheam Range (pronounced  or ) is a mountain range in the Fraser Valley region of the Lower Mainland of British Columbia near the city of Chilliwack. The region is also a part of the Skagit Range of the Canadian Cascades and contains many rugged peaks.

The western peaks in the range - Cheam, Lady, Baby Munday and Stewart, are known in areas of the Fraser Valley where they are visible, as the "Four Sisters".  The eastern peaks in the range are referred to as the Lucky Four Group because of their proximity to the abandoned Lucky Four Mine; the glacier in the cirque formed by Welch and Foley is called the Lucky Four Glacier. Foley, Welch and Stewart commemorate partners in Foley, Welch and Stewart, an important contractor in early British Columbia responsible for building the Pacific Great Eastern Railway and other projects.

The highest point is the Welch Peak.

Peaks

 Cheam Peak
 Lady Peak
 Knight Peak
 Baby Munday Peak
 Stewart Peak
 The Still
 Welch Peak
 Foley Peak

References

Mountains of the Lower Mainland
Canadian Cascades
Two-thousanders of British Columbia
Yale Division Yale Land District